Pasadena High School (PHS) is a public high school in Pasadena, California. It is one of four high schools in the Pasadena Unified School District.

History
The school was first established as a district school in 1884 and became Pasadena High School in 1891. In 1928, the school merged into Pasadena Junior College and operated as a four-year school, grades 11, 12, 13 and 14. Pasadena realigned its 6-4-4 school system in 1954 with Pasadena High School regaining its separate identity. PHS, however, shared the Pasadena City College Colorado Boulevard campus through the graduating class of 1960 when PHS moved to its present campus on Sierra Madre Boulevard at Washington Boulevard.

The Rose Parade, post parade Showcase of Floats takes place in front of the high school utilizing some of the school grounds and parking lots.

Pasadena High School's athletic field was renovated, adding light towers, a new track and replacing the grass field with artificial turf. It opened at the start of the 2009-10 school year. The school's junior varsity and varsity football teams as well as the boys' and girls' soccer teams play their home games. The school also is used for its track meets in the spring.

On January 8, 2019, Pasadena High School opened the renovated Tom Hamilton Gymnasium at the cost of $19 million. It is used for boys and girls junior varsity and varsity basketball teams and the girls volleyball team for their home games.

The school's auditorium is named after Gladiss Edwards, who was the principal during the late 1950s and into the 1960s.

Student profile
In the 2016-17 school year, Pasadena High School's student population consisted of 1,777 students, with 60.3% of students being Latino, 17% white, 11.8% African-American, and 5.8% Asian, 0.3% Native Hawaiian/Pacific Islander, and 0.2% American Indian/Alaska Native.

Academics
Pasadena High School offers several special unique programs. The Graphic Communications Academy was established in partnership with the Printing Industry of Southern California and Pasadena City College. The Visual Arts and Design Academy is linked with the Art Center College of Design, Pasadena City College and the Pasadena Art Armory. The Center for Independent Study program is a remedial program to help students who are behind in credits. PHS also offers a career pathway called the App Academy, which helps students learn about web design.

Sports

Turkey Tussle
Pasadena High School competes against John Muir High School at the Rose Bowl in a football game known as the Turkey Tussle. The tradition began in 1947, and Muir leads the series 42-18-2.

NJROTC
Pasadena High School also has a NNDCC unit, which is a non-funded version of the US Navy's NJROTC program. Pasadena High School has had a Reserves Officer's Training Corps since 1920 starting as Army but has also been Air Force and Marines as well in the past. They disbanded in 2017-2018 academic year.

Notable alumni

 Robert Armstrong, 1968, cartoonist, known for creating Mickey Rat who popularized the term "couch potato"
 Louise Beavers, 1920, Actress
 Walt Becker, 1986, film director, "Van Wilder," "Wild Dogs," "Old Dogs (film)"
 Armon Binns, 2011, NFL player
 Mario Clark, NFL cornerback
 Carol Cleveland, 1960, actress, associated with Monty Python's Flying Circus TV show
 Mike Connelly, 1952, NFL lineman, Dallas Cowboys
 Michael Cooper, 1974,  basketball player and coach, 5-time NBA champion, WNBA head coach
 Donald D. Engen, 1941, US Navy Vice Admiral, former Administrator of Federal Aviation Administration and Director of National Air and Space Museum
 Bob Eubanks, 1955, radio-TV personality, host of The Newlywed Game and longtime broadcaster of Rose Parade
 Howard Hawks, 1914, Hollywood film director (Scarface, Gentlemen Prefer Blondes, Rio Bravo)
 Chris Holden, 1978, 53rd Mayor of Pasadena, city councilman (District 3) (1989–2012), California State Assemblyman, 41st District (2012–)
 Michael Holton, 1979, basketball player and ESPN analyst
 Chidi Iwuoma, 1996, NFL Player
 Payton Jordan, Hall of Fame Olympic track coach and Masters track and field world record holder
 Kathryn Le Veque, 1982, bestselling historical romance fiction author and publisher
 Jim Matheny, UCLA and professional football player
Chris McAlister, 1995, NFL Player
 Edwin McMillan, co-recipient of 1951 Nobel Prize in Chemistry
 Zephyr Moore Ramsey, African American lawyer
 Charley Paddock, two-time Olympic champion, "fastest man in the world"
 William H. Press, 1965, astrophysicist and 165th president of American Association for the Advancement of Science
 QUIÑ (Bianca Quiñones), singer
 James Sanford, 1980 world's fastest human
 Stan Smith, 1964, tennis player and two-time Grand Slam singles champion
 Bill Sweek, 1964, basketball player and coach
 Jerry Tarkanian, college basketball coach, NCAA champion and Hall of Famer
 Kevin Tighe, 1962, actor Emergency!
 Lester Towns, 1995, NFL player
 James Turrell, 1961, an American artist known for his work within the Light and Space movement
 Alex Van Halen, 1972, member of rock band Van Halen
 Eddie Van Halen, 1973, founding member of Van Halen
 Lee Walls, Major League Baseball outfielder
 Cynthia Whitcomb, 1969, television writer and playwright
 Dick Williams, 1947, former Major League Baseball player and manager

References

External links
 

Educational institutions established in 1884
Public high schools in Los Angeles County, California
1884 establishments in California
Schools in Pasadena, California